Steffan Woischnik is a paralympic athlete from Germany competing mainly in category T54 sprint events.

Steffan has competed in 2 Paralympics, his first in 1996 he competed in the 100m, 200m and 400m and was part of the German 4 × 400 m relay team.  In 2000 Summer Paralympics he added the 4 × 100 m to the events he did but it was as part of the German 4 × 400 m relay team that he won is only medal, a bronze.

References

Paralympic athletes of Germany
Athletes (track and field) at the 1996 Summer Paralympics
Athletes (track and field) at the 2000 Summer Paralympics
Paralympic bronze medalists for Germany
Living people
Medalists at the 1996 Summer Paralympics
Medalists at the 2000 Summer Paralympics
Year of birth missing (living people)
Paralympic medalists in athletics (track and field)
German male wheelchair racers